Tankard is a German thrash metal band from Frankfurt, founded in 1982. Alongside Kreator, Destruction and Sodom, Tankard is often considered one of the "Big Four" of Teutonic thrash metal. Stylistically, Tankard have consistently played thrash metal that thematically centres primarily on alcohol reverence, unlike the remaining "Big Teutonic Four" (Kreator, Destruction and Sodom), who are all known for covering such topics related to death, politics, violence and anti-fascism.

History

Formation and early years (1982–1985) 
Tankard was formed in 1982 by three classmates, bassist Andreas "Gerre" Geremia, guitarist Axel Katzmann and vocalist Frank Thorwarth. Thorwarth and Gerre soon switched roles; at the same time the trio added drummer Oliver Werner and second guitarist Bernhard Rapprich. They chose their name from a dictionary upon seeing its definition as "beer mug". Their earliest written song was called "Ray Death", a song about nuclear war and their first gig was played in a local classroom in 1983. As drinking alcohol in the school was banned, they smuggled their beer in with milk cartons. Soon after, Bernhard Rapprich left the band as his conservative father did not want him "hanging around with a bunch of drunks" and he was replaced by Andy Bulgaropoulos.

With the lineup now stabilised, the band released their first demo, titled Heavy Metal Vanguard, in 1984. After this, the band toured with fellow German thrashers Sodom. SPV were interested in signing both bands, but allegedly SPV retracted a deal after seeing the band perform live. In 1985 they released a second demo, Alcoholic Metal, which cemented their thrash metal style and lyrical themes. Both of these demos were very popular in the underground, and on the strength of this demo they signed with Noise Records. The eight-track demo also features rough versions of four songs that would later appear on their debut album, Zombie Attack

The Noise years (1986–1995) 
Zombie Attack was released in July 1986. In October 1987 their sophomore album, Chemical Invasion, was released, with the album art being the first of eight done for the band by artist Sebastian Krüger, followed a year later by The Morning After. Both of these albums were produced by Harris Johns, who would go on to produce all of the band's albums up to 2000. However, shortly after the release of compilation Hair of the Dog, original drummer Oliver Werner quit the band to be replaced by Arnulf Tunn, and the band released three albums with this lineup: The Meaning of Life, Stone Cold Sober and Two-Faced. They also recorded the live album Fat, Ugly and Live during this time. This lineup then folded when Tunn was replaced by Olaf Zissel, who remains in the band to this day, in May 1994 and the next year founding member Katzmann was forced to leave due to osteoarthritis in the wrist. That year the band released The Tankard, which is widely viewed as a very good album by fans and critics alike, and is their final album with Noise.

Later career (1995–present) 
The band decided not to replace Katzmann and remain a one guitar band. Also, after the release of The Tankard, the band signed with Century Media Records. After the release of Disco Destroyer, longtime guitarist Andy Bulgaropoulos left the band to spend more time with his family. He was replaced by Andreas Gutjahr, forming the current lineup of the band. The first album released with Gutjahr was Kings of Beer, which was their second and final studio album with Century Media. The band signed with AFM Records and release five studio albums in a decade with the label, starting with B-Day and ending with Vol(l)ume 14. On 27 July 2012, the band announced their signing with Nuclear Blast and released their first album with the label, A Girl Called Cerveza, that day. Also that year, they released a four-way split with Sodom, Kreator and Destruction called The Big Teutonic 4. This release cemented them as a major force in German metal. They released another studio album, R.I.B. on 20 June 2014.

In 2015, Olaf Zissel was hospitalised with what was suspected to be a stroke. He was replaced temporarily by Gerd Lücking of Holy Moses. Their latest album achieved no. 41 on the German charts. While they have built a fan base, they continue to have day jobs.

Their 17th studio album titled One Foot in the Grave was released on 2 June 2017. The band released their 18th studio album, Pavlov's Dawgs, on September 30, 2022.

Band members

Current members 
Andreas "Gerre" Geremia – vocals 
Frank Thorwarth – bass 
Olaf Zissel – drums 
Andreas Gutjahr – guitars

Former members 
Bernhard Rapprich – guitars 
Oliver Werner – drums 
Axel Katzmann – guitars 
Andy Bulgaropulos – guitars 
Arnulf Tunn – drums

Timeline

Discography

Studio albums

Other releases 
Heavy Metal Vanguard (1984) – demo
Alcoholic Metal (1985) – demo
Alien (1989) – EP
Hair of the Dog (1989) – compilation
Open All Night (1990) – video
Fat, Ugly and Live (1991) – live album
Fat, Ugly and Still (A) Live (2005) – DVD
Best Case Scenario: 25 Years in Beers (2007) – re-recorded compilation album
 Schwarz-weiß wie Schnee (2017) – EP
 Hymns for the Drunk (2018) compilation

References

External links 

 Official website
 
 

1982 establishments in Germany
AFM Records artists
Century Media Records artists
German thrash metal musical groups
Musical groups established in 1982
Musical quartets
Noise Records artists
Nuclear Blast artists